Sam Lewis (born 11 November 1990) is a Welsh rugby union player. A flanker, he currently plays for Bristol Bears.

Personal
His brother Ben Lewis is a former professional rugby union player.

References

External links
 Ospreys profile
 Swansea profile

Welsh rugby union players
Swansea RFC players
Ospreys (rugby union) players
1990 births
Living people
Rugby union players from Swansea
People educated at Ysgol Gyfun Gŵyr
Worcester Warriors players
Rugby union flankers